The Dream and Lie of Franco is a series of two sheets of prints, comprising 18 individual images, and an accompanying prose poem, by Pablo Picasso produced in 1937. The sheets each contain nine images arranged in a 3x3 grid. The first 14, in etching and aquatint, are dated  8 January 1937. The remaining four images were added to the second printing plate later, without use of aquatint, and dated June 7, 1937.

The Dream and Lie of Franco is significant as Picasso's first overtly political work and prefigures his iconic political painting Guernica. The etchings satirise Spanish Generalísimo Francisco Franco's claim to represent and defend conservative Spanish culture and values by showing him in various ridiculous guises destroying Spain and its culture while the poem denounces "evil-omened polyps". Three of the four images added in June 1937 are directly related to studies for Guernica.

The individual images were originally intended to be published as postcards to raise funds for the Spanish Republican government, and sold at the Spanish Pavilion of the 1937 World's Fair, although it is unclear whether any prints were made or sold in postcard format.

In his review of the etchings for The Spectator in October 1937, art historian (and member of the Cambridge Five spy-ring) Anthony Blunt complained that the work could not "reach more than the limited coterie of aesthetes". Critic and author John Golding on the other hand, claimed that "more than any other work by Picasso Dream and Lie of Franco breaks down, as the Surrealists so passionately longed to, distinctions between thought, writing and visual imagery."

Images
The images form a sequence like those in a comic book (in particular, the Spanish auca) and have a loose narrative:
Franco's form changes from panel to panel. The Spanish dictator's appearance has been likened by various writers to a "jackbooted phallus", "an evil-omened polyp" and "a grotesque homunculus with a head like a gesticulating and tuberous sweet potato".

 Franco riding a horse waving a sword and a flag
 Franco, with a ridiculously large penis, waving a sword and a flag
 Franco attacking a classical sculpture with a pick
 Franco dressed as a courtesan with a flower and a fan
 Franco being gored by a bull
 Franco at prayer surrounded by barbed wire
 Franco on top of a dead creature
 Franco chasing a winged horse
 Franco riding on a pig carrying a spear
 Franco eating a dead horse
 The aftermath of a battle with a corpse
 The aftermath of a battle with a dead horse
 Franco and a bull
 Franco and the bull fighting

Additions to the second plate (including studies for Guernica):
 A woman crying and reaching up
 A woman fleeing a burning house carrying a child
 A woman cradling a child
 A woman shot with an arrow and reaching up amid devastation

Prose

References

Selected bibliography

External links
 Lambiek Comiclopedia article about Pablo Picasso, which also discusses The Dream and Lie of Franco.

Pablo Picasso etchings
Basque history
Spanish Civil War in popular culture
War art
1937 works
20th-century etchings
Political art
Horses in art
Cattle in art
Bullfighting in art
Anti-Francoism
Anti-fascist works
Anti-war works
Anti-war comics
1937 in comics
Comics set in Spain
Comics set in the 1930s
Satirical comics
Cultural depictions of Francisco Franco
Works about Falangism
Poetry by Pablo Picasso
Spanish political satire